Sychnacedes is a genus of moths in the subfamily Lymantriinae. The genus was erected by Cyril Leslie Collenette in 1953.

Species
Sychnacedes epiclithra (Collenette, 1956)
Sychnacedes idiopis Collenette, 1953
Sychnacedes perroti (Oberthür, 1922)

References

Lymantriinae
Moth genera